William Thomas Wells QC (10 August 1908 – 3 January 1990) was an English barrister and Labour Party politician.

Wells was from an upper-class background and went to the Public School Lancing College near Brighton, and to Balliol College, Oxford. He was called to the Bar by the Middle Temple in 1932.

During World War II, Wells served in the army on the General Staff to the War Office, being promoted to the rank of Major. He was elected as the Member of Parliament (MP) for Walsall in the 1945 general election.

Although never taking Ministerial office, Wells's experience of the law was used on departmental committees. He was a member of the Lord Chancellor's Committee on the Practice and Procedure of the Supreme Court which sat from 1947 to 1953, of the Magistrates' Courts Rule Committee from 1954, and of the Wolfenden Committee on Prostitution and Homosexual Offences from 1954 to 1957.

Wells remained an active Barrister throughout his Parliamentary career and was made a Queen's Counsel in 1955. He was Deputy Chairman of Hertfordshire Quarter Sessions from 1961 to 1971, and in 1963 he became a Bencher of the Middle Temple. From 1965 to 1971 he was Recorder of King's Lynn, giving up the job when he became a Recorder of the Crown Court from 1972.

Moderate in politics, Wells supported British membership of the European Economic Community in 1971 against a three line whip. He retired at the end of the Parliament in 1974. From 1976 he was made a Chairman of Industrial Tribunals. He joined the Social Democratic Party (SDP) in 1981.

References
M. Stenton and S. Lees, "Who's Who of British MPs", Vol. IV (Harvester Press, 1981)

External links 
 

1908 births
1990 deaths
Labour Party (UK) MPs for English constituencies
People educated at Lancing College
UK MPs 1945–1950
UK MPs 1950–1951
UK MPs 1951–1955
UK MPs 1955–1959
UK MPs 1959–1964
UK MPs 1964–1966
UK MPs 1966–1970
UK MPs 1970–1974
Alumni of Balliol College, Oxford
Members of the Middle Temple
English barristers
English King's Counsel
Social Democratic Party (UK) politicians
20th-century English lawyers